Erythranthe exigua is a rare species of monkeyflower known by the common name San Bernardino Mountains monkeyflower. It was formerly known as Mimulus exiguus.

Distribution
It is native to the San Bernardino Mountains of southern California, as well as an area of Baja California. It grows in moist, rocky habitat, including the rare quartz pebble plain habitat of the mountain meadows near Big Bear, Southern California.

Description
Erythranthe exigua is a petite annual herb producing a hair-thin, erect stem just a few centimeters tall. The herbage is reddish in color and lightly hairy. The oppositely arranged oval leaves are a few millimeters in length. The tubular lavender flower is under 4 millimeters long and the corolla is divided into five lobes.

References

External links
Jepson Manual Treatment — Mimulus exiguus
USDA Plants Profile: Mimulus exiguus
Mimulus exiguus - Photo gallery

exigua
Flora of California
Flora of Baja California
Natural history of the Transverse Ranges
~
Plants described in 1885
Flora without expected TNC conservation status